Chenopodium nitrariaceum, commonly known as the nitre goosefoot, is a shrub in the subfamily Chenopodioideae of the family Amaranthaceae (sensu lato), native to Australia.

References

Flora of New South Wales
Flora of South Australia
Flora of the Northern Territory
Flora of Victoria (Australia)
nitrariaceum
Taxa named by Ferdinand von Mueller